Lee Kil-yong (born 30 March 1976) is a South Korean football player who played at forward for Changwon City at National League in South Korea.

He also played for Ulsan Hyundai Horang-i, Pohang Steelers, Bucheon SK, Icheon Hummel Korea and BIT.

External links
 
 Changwon City FC profile  
 N-League Player Record - 이길용 

1976 births
Living people
Association football forwards
South Korean footballers
Ulsan Hyundai FC players
Pohang Steelers players
Jeju United FC players
Changwon City FC players
K League 1 players
Korea National League players
Footballers from Seoul